Sosnovo is a rural locality (a selo) and the administrative center of Sosnovskoye Rural Settlement, Chaykovsky, Perm Krai, Russia. The population was 924 as of 2010. There are 38 streets.

References 

Rural localities in Chaykovsky urban okrug